The San Antonio Commanders were a professional American football franchise based in San Antonio, Texas, and one of the eight members of the Alliance of American Football (AAF). The league began play in February 2019. The team played their home games at the Alamodome. The team was led by head coach Mike Riley.

On April 2, 2019, the league's football operations were reportedly suspended, and on April 4 the league allowed players to leave their contracts to sign with NFL teams. The league filed for Chapter 7 bankruptcy on April 17, 2019. The league left debts of over $1.4 million to three local hotels and $200,000 to a catering business.

History
The Alliance San Antonio charter team of the Alliance of American Football spring league was announced on June 21, 2018. Also, the league announced former San Diego Chargers coach Mike Riley as head coach and former Dallas Cowboys fullback Daryl Johnston serves as General Manager of the team. The western four teams' names and logos were revealed on September 25 with San Antonio as the Commanders. The name is a tribute to San Antonio's military history, with maroon and silver representing the city and the small swords carried by military officers, respectively.

The final 52-man roster was set on January 30, 2019. The team's first game was a 15–6 win at home against the San Diego Fleet on Saturday, February 9, 2019.

The Commanders, who drew an average of approximately 27,720 fans to each home game, were by far the best-attended team in the AAF.

The league was suspended on April 2, 2019, with about 20 minutes left in the Commanders' practice. "It ended in the blink of an eye. Like that," Riley said later.

The next year, the XFL began discussions about relocating one of its eight teams to San Antonio; this would eventually bear fruit with the San Antonio Brahmas in 2023.

Final Roster

Allocation pool 
The team's assigned area, which designated player rights, included the following:

Colleges
 Abilene Christian
 Angelo State
 Baylor
 Houston
 Houston Baptist
 Incarnate Word
 Lamar
 Midwestern State
 North Texas
 Oklahoma
 Prairie View A&M
 Rice

 Sam Houston
 SMU
 Stephen F. Austin
 Tarleton State
 TCU
 Texas
 Texas A&M
 Texas A&M–Kingsville
 Texas–Permian Basin
 Texas Southern
 Texas State
 Toledo
 UTSA
 West Texas A&M

National Football League (NFL)
 Dallas Cowboys
 Houston Texans
 Kansas City Chiefs
 Philadelphia Eagles

Canadian Football League (CFL)
 Saskatchewan Roughriders

Staff

Notable Former Players 

 Scott Daly - Current Detroit Lions Long Snapper
 Greg Ward - Former Philadelphia Eagles Wide Receiver
 Logan Woodside - Current Atlanta Falcons Quarterback

2019 season

Final standings

Schedule

Preseason

Regular season
All times Central

 Changed from original time and network.

Game summaries

Week 1: San Diego

With the win, the Commanders started 1–0.

Week 2: Orlando

First loss in Commanders history. San Antonio fell to 1-1.

Week 3: at San Diego

First time in Commanders history with consecutive losses. Commanders drop to 1-2.

Week 4: at Birmingham

First road win in Commanders history. Commanders improve to 2-2.

Week 5: at Arizona

First time in Commanders history with consecutive wins. Commanders improve to 3-2.

Week 6: at Atlanta

Commanders improve to 4-2.

Week 7: Salt Lake

Commanders improve to 5-2. Also, this game marks the first time in league history that single game attendance was above 30,000.

Week 8: Arizona

Media
In addition to league-wide television coverage through NFL Network, CBS Sports Network, TNT, and B/R Live, Commanders' games were also broadcast on local radio by KZDC, an ESPN Radio affiliate. The team also had a television agreement with local station KMYS of the Sinclair Broadcast Group to carry all Commanders' games that were not broadcast nationally.

References

Further reading
 

 
2018 establishments in Texas
2019 disestablishments in Texas